is a scientific variety show broadcast in Japan by NHK Educational TV.

Presenters
 Yu Shinagawa
 Tomoharu Shōji
 Mai Oshima

External links
  

Japanese variety television shows
NHK original programming
2009 Japanese television series debuts